Gregg Jay Zuckerman (born 1949) is a mathematician at Yale University who discovered Zuckerman functors and translation functors, and with Anthony W. Knapp classified the irreducible tempered representations of semisimple Lie groups.

He received his Ph.D. in mathematics from Princeton University in 1975 after completing a doctoral dissertation, titled "Some character identities for semisimple Lie groups", under the supervision of Elias M. Stein.

Publications

References

External links
Yale page

1949 births
Living people
20th-century American mathematicians
21st-century American mathematicians
Princeton University alumni
Yale University faculty